The Union for the Defence of the Republic, after 1968 renamed Union of Democrats for the Republic, commonly abbreviated UDR, was a Gaullist political party of France that existed from 1968 to 1976.

The UDR was the successor to Charles de Gaulle's earlier party, the Rally of the French People, and was organised in 1958, along with the founding of the Fifth Republic as the Union for the New Republic (UNR), and in 1962 merged with the Democratic Union of Labour, a left-wing Gaullist group. In 1967 it was joined by some Christian Democrats to form the Union of Democrats for the Fifth Republic, later dropping the 'Fifth'. After the May 1968 crisis, it formed a right-wing coalition named Union for the Defense of the Republic (UDR); it was subsequently renamed Union of Democrats for the Republic, retaining the abbreviation UDR, in October 1968.

Under de Gaulle's successor Georges Pompidou it promoted  the Gaullist movement. It dissolved in 1976, and its successor was the Rally for the Republic (RPR) founded by Jacques Chirac.

Secretaries-general 
1968–71: Robert Poujade
1971–72: René Tomasini
1972–73: Alain Peyrefitte 
1973–74: Alexandre Sanguinetti
1974–75: Jacques Chirac
1975–76: André Bord 
1976: Yves Guéna

Election results

Presidential

National Assembly

See also 
 Gaullist Party

References

Further reading
S, major scholarly history of France
 Hibbs, Douglas A., and Nicholas Vasilatos. "Economics and Politics in France: Economic Performance and Mass Political Support for Presidents Pompidou and Giscard d'Estaing." European Journal of Political Research (1981) 9#2 pp: 133-145. online
 Wilson, Frank L.  "Gaullism without de Gaulle," Western Political Quarterly (1973) 26#3 pp. 485–506 in JSTOR

Defunct political parties in France
 
Political parties of the French Fifth Republic
Right-wing parties in France
1967 establishments in France
Political parties disestablished in 1976